Ariane Roy (born March 19, 1997) is a Canadian pop singer from Quebec City, Quebec, whose debut album Medium plaisir was released in 2022.

She was a finalist in the virtual 2020 edition of the Francouvertes music competition.

Her single "Ta main" was a SOCAN Songwriting Prize nominee in the French category in 2021. Its music video was a Félix Award nominee for Video of the Year at the 43rd Félix Awards, and a Juno Award nominee for Video of the Year at the Juno Awards of 2022. 

At the 44th Félix Awards in 2022, Roy won the award for Revelation of the Year and Medium plaisir was a nominee for Pop Album of the Year, and at the Juno Awards of 2023, Medium plaisir was nominated for Francophone Album of the Year.

References

1997 births
Living people
21st-century Canadian women singers
Canadian pop singers
Canadian women singer-songwriters
French Quebecers
French-language singers of Canada
Musicians from Quebec City
Singers from Quebec
Félix Award winners